The Battle of Lippa was an engagement which took place on 7 September 1813 in what is now Croatia, then part of Kingdom of Croatia, part of the Austrian Empire.  Though a small engagement, the battle marked the turning point of the Illyrian Campaign of 1813, which would lead to the fall of the Illyrian Provinces.

Background 
When the War of the Sixth Coalition broke out, the Austrian Empire remained loyal to the French Empire, and foreign minister Klemens von Metternich aimed to mediate in good faith a peace between France and its continental enemies, but it became apparent that the price was to be the dismantling of the Confederation of the Rhine, the Napoleon-controlled union of all German states aside from Prussia and Austria, and the return to France's pre-Revolutionary borders. Napoleon was not interested in any such compromise that would in effect end his empire, so Austria joined the allies and declared war on France in August 1813.

The new Austrian Army of Italy was to attack in the direction of Northern Italy/Piedmont and force a southern front in France.  In September the Austrians opened up their Invasion of Illyria, and on 7 September a small Italian garrison fought an Austrian brigade on its way towards Trieste.  This action became known as the Battle of Lippa.

The battle ended in an Austrian victory, and the Italians fell back to Trieste.

Order of Battle 
Franco-Italian Forces

 Brigade Rougier, 5th Division, commanded by Général de Brigade Rougier
 1st Italian Line Infantry Regiment (1 battalion)
 Dalmatian Infantry Regiment (4 battalions) — French auxiliary regiment
 2nd Italian Light Infantry Regiment (1 battalion)
 Foot Artillery Battery (4 x Canon de 6 système An XI field guns)

Austrian Forces

 Division Nugent, commanded by Generalmajor Römischer Fürst, Laval Graf von Nugent-Westmeath
 Brigade Csivich, commanded by Generalmajor Ignaz, Freiherr Csivich von Rohr
 5th Hussar Regiment "Radetzky" (1 1/2 sqns)
 Horse Artillery Battery (6 x 3-pdr guns)
 Brigade
 5th Grenzer Infantry Regiment "Warasdiner–Kreutzer" (2nd battalion)
 52nd Infantry Regiment "Erzherzog Franz Carl" (1 battalion)
 Foot Artillery Battery (2 x 3-pdr guns)

Footnotes

References 

 

Battles of the Napoleonic Wars
Battles involving France
Battles involving the Kingdom of Italy (Napoleonic)
Battles involving Austria
Military history of Croatia
Conflicts in 1813
Battle of Lippa